Éric Barone (born 4 November 1960 in Oyonnax, France) is a French sportsman. He holds the world speed record for bicycle, on both snow and gravel. His French nickname is "Baron Rouge", which means Red Baron.

Early career highlights 
After some initial jobs, including acting as stunt double of actors Sylvester Stallone, Jean-Claude Van Damme and Adrian Paul, at 34 he started trying to achieve speed records on a bicycle. Barone achieved the record on snow in 1994, beating the previous record by Christian Taillefer. He broke the record again in 1999 and on 21 April 2000, when he reaches  at Les Arcs ski resort, France, using an aerodynamic prototype bicycle, helmet and clothing.

In 1999 he reached  on gravel in Hawaii. After that, his goal was to show he could be faster on gravel. He discovered the Cerro Negro volcano in Nicaragua. Its clean slopes and soft volcanic ash were ideal.

Record setting 
Barone believed he could do more, and decided to try again some time later. On 12 May 2002, he reached  on his first attempt, on a serial production bicycle. A few minutes later, he descended again, on a prototype bicycle. He rode , and just after the computers had registered , the bike sharply entered a section of the hill with a lower gradient, causing the front bicycle fork to break off, and the bicycle and rider to crash hard and tumble down the hill at high speed. The helmet saved his life, but he had several broken ribs and other injuries. Barone said he would never descend again at the Cerro Negro, but announced he was willing to beat again the record on snow in the future. The record using a serial production bicycle on gravel was beaten in 2011, when Markus Stöckl reached  on a volcano in Nicaragua. The prototype bicycle record, on gravel, still belongs to Barone.

During his career, Barone has descended the slopes of Mount Fuji in Japan, Mauna Kea and Kilauea in Hawaii, Etna and Stromboli in Sicily, the Nevado de Toluca in Mexico, and 20 volcanoes in Nicaragua.

Other work 
After his records, Barone has worked attracting tourists who want to discover the Volcano route and other sites in Nicaragua.

See also 
Cycling records

References 

1960 births
Living people
People from Oyonnax
French male cyclists
Sportspeople from Ain
Cyclists from Auvergne-Rhône-Alpes